Korovintsevo is a rural locality (a village) in Styopantsevskoye Rural Settlement, Vyaznikovsky District, Vladimir Oblast, Russia. The population was 37 as of 2010.

Geography 
Korovintsevo is located 35 km southwest of Vyazniki (the district's administrative centre) by road. Stepantsevo is the nearest rural locality.

References 

Rural localities in Vyaznikovsky District